Like all municipalities of Puerto Rico, Canóvanas is subdivided into administrative units called barrios, which are roughly comparable to minor civil divisions. The barrios and subbarrios, in turn, are further subdivided into smaller local populated place areas/units called sectores (sectors in English). The types of sectores may vary, from normally sector to urbanización to reparto to barriada to residencial, among others. Some sectors appear in two barrios.

List of sectors by barrio

Canóvanas
Apartamentos Alborada
Apartamentos Ciudad Jardín
Barrio Cambalache
Barrio San Isidro
Condominios Park View Terrace
Estancias del Río
Hacienda de Canóvanas
Parcelas Viejas
Río Plantation
River Gardens
River Plantation
River Valley Park
River Valley Town Park
River Villas
Sector Dos Cuerdas
Sector Haciendas Cambalache
Sector Hipódromo El Comandante
Sector Los Bobos
Sector Los Pérez
Sector Los Sotos
Sector Valle Hills
Sector Villa Hugo I y II
Señorío de Gonzaga
Urbanización Ciudad Jardín (Walk Up)
Urbanización Estancias de Campo Rico
Urbanización Forest Plantation
Urbanización Loíza Valley
Urbanización Mansiones del Tesoro
Urbanización River Valley
Urbanización Villas de Cambalache
Urbanización Vistas de Río Grande

San Isidro comunidad
Comunidad
Estancias Tierra Alta
Extensión Quintas y Estancias de Jardines de Palmarejo
Parcelas Nuevas
Sector Las Delicias
Sector Monte Verde
Sector Sucusucu
Sector Villa Conquistador I y II
Sector Villa Tiro

Canóvanas barrio-pueblo
Apartamentos del Valle
Apartamentos Portal Campestre
Condominios Plaza del Este
Residencial Jesús T. Piñero
Sector Hipódromo el Comandante
Urbanización Ciudad Jardín
Urbanización Country View
Urbanización del Pilar
Urbanización Jardines de Canóvanas
Urbanización Las Vegas
Urbanización Quintas de Canóvanas
Urbanización Villa Dorada

Cubuy

Comunidad Villa Sin Miedo
Parcelas Benítez
Sector Añoranza (de Cubuy)
Sector Condesa
Sector Cubuy Marines
Sector La Gallera
Sector Los Cafés
Sector Los Pereira

Hato Puerco

Campo Rico
Camino Los Matos
Camino Los Navarro
Carretera 185
Finca Pozos
Parcelas Alturas de Campo Rico
Parcelas Campo Rico
Sector Belia
Sector Canovanillas
Sector Chorrito
Sector El Purgatorio
Sector Febo
Sector La Marina
Sector La Vega
Sector Loma del Viento
Sector Los Castillos
Sector Los González
Sector Maga
Sector Puente Moreno
Sector Toma de Agua
Urbanización Las Haciendas

Palma Sola

Carretera 957
Sector El Hoyo
Sector Los Castros
Sector Maga
Sector Peniel

Lomas
Parcelas Las Cuatrocientas  
Sector Las Yayas 
Sector Lomas Cole 
Sector Los Casillas 
Sector Los Fortis 
Sector Los González 
Sector Martín Rodríguez 
Sector Quebrada Prieta

Torrecilla Alta
Parcelas Torrecilla Alta 
Sector Finca Virginia 
Sector La Central
Sector Parachofer 
Sector Pueblo Indio 
Sector Pueblo Seco 
Sector Santa Catalina
Sector Sierra Maestra 
Sector Villa Borinquen 
Sector Villa Inglés 
Sector Villa Santa 
Urbanización Brisas de Canóvanas 
Urbanización Brisas de Loíza 
Urbanización Eucalipto 
Urbanización Usubal

See also

 List of communities in Puerto Rico

References

Canóvanas
Canóvanas